Namsung is a South Korean multinational company headquartered in Seoul. Namsung was founded by Yoon Bong-Soo in 1965 as an OEM electronics manufacturing company. Namsung's subsidiaries include Namsung Telecom, Dreamer, Namsung International, and Namsung America.

Namsung America ( Dual Electronics Corp) produces and sells a wide selection of mobile electronics, marine electronics, home audio, and GPS receivers under the Dual, Axxera, and Jensen brands. Dual Electronics Corporation is headquartered in Heathrow, Florida with distribution centers in Nevada and Illinois.

History

Namsung's important milestones are listed below.

1965	Established Namsung 
1973	Manufacture and export of black and white TV 
1974	Manufacture and export of color TV (1st in South Korea) 
1976	Established Namsung Telecom 
1976	Tin Order of Industrial Service Merit 
1981    Bronze Order of Industrial Service Merit 
1982    Iron Order of Industrial Service Merit 
1987    Silver Order of Industrial Service Merit 
1989    Listed on Korea Stock Exchange 
1991    Established Namsung International, Ltd.  
1993    Established Namsung Electronic, Ltd. 
2000	Established Dreamer, Ltd. 
2002	Construction of PLAZA CAMELLIA Mall in Seoul 
2002	Construction of CROWN PLAZA in Seoul  
2003	Manufacture and export of Dual (brand) electronics  
2003	Established Namsung America, Ltd. 
2004	Established Dreamer i, Ltd. 
2005	Construction of NAMSUNG PLAZA in Seoul 
2015	Acquired Jensen Electronics from Audiovox

References

Companies listed on the Korea Exchange
South Korean companies established in 1965
Electronics companies established in 1963